Podborye is a rural locality (a village) in Orlovskoye Rural Settlement, Velikoustyugsky District, Vologda Oblast, Russia. The population was 10 as of 2002.

Geography 
Podborye is located 67 km southeast of Veliky Ustyug (the district's administrative centre) by road. Chernevo is the nearest rural locality.

References 

Rural localities in Velikoustyugsky District